119th Regiment or 119th Infantry Regiment may refer to:

 119th Infantry (The Mooltan Regiment), a unit of the Indian Army
 Sassuntsi-Davit Tank Regiment (119th 'Sassuntsi-Davit' Separate Engineer Tank Regiment), a unit of the Soviet Army
 119th (The Prince's Own) Regiment of Foot, a unit of the British Army
 119th Regiment of Foot (1794), a unit of the British Army
 119th Infantry Regiment (United States), a unit of the United States Army

See also
 119th Division (disambiguation)
 119th Battalion
 119th Company
 119 Squadron (disambiguation)